The 2017–18 Grand Prix of Figure Skating Final and ISU Junior Grand Prix Final took place from 7 to 10 December 2017 at the Nagoya Civic General Gymnasium (Nippon Gaishi Hall) in Nagoya, Japan. Nagoya was announced as the host on 3 November 2016. The combined event was the culmination of two international series — the Grand Prix of Figure Skating and the Junior Grand Prix. Medals were awarded in the disciplines of men's singles, ladies' singles, pair skating, and ice dance on the senior and junior levels.

Records 

The following new ISU best scores were set during this competition:

Schedule

(Local time)

Thursday, December 7
 14:10 - Junior: Pairs' short
 15:30 - Junior: Men's short
 16:40 - Junior: Ladies' short
 Opening ceremony
 18:15 - Senior: Pairs' short
 19:30 - Senior: Men's short
 20:40 - Senior: Short dance

Friday, December 8
 14:40 - Junior: Short dance
 16:00 - Junior: Pairs' free
 17:30 - Junior: Men's free
 18:55 - Senior: Ladies' short
 20:15 - Senior: Men's free
 Victory ceremony – Senior Men, Junior Men, Junior Pairs

Saturday, December 9
 13:45 - Junior: Free dance
 15:05 - Junior: Ladies' free
 16:25 - Senior: Pairs' free
 17:55 - Senior: Free dance
 19:20 - Senior: Ladies' free
 Victory ceremony – Senior Ladies, Junior Ice Dance, Junior Ladies, Senior Pairs, Senior Ice Dance

Sunday, December 10
 Gala exhibition

Qualifiers

Senior-level qualifiers

Junior-level qualifiers

Medalists

Senior

Junior

Medals table

Overall

Senior

Junior

Senior-level results

Men

Ladies

Pairs

Ice dance

Junior-level results

Men

Ladies 
Alena Kostornaia broke the junior ladies short program world record, 70.92 held by Alina Zagitova, with a score of 71.65. Alexandra Trusova broke it again 13 minutes later with a score of 73.25. Rika Kihira became the first lady to land triple axel-triple toeloop combination in the free skate.

Pairs

Ice dance

References

Citations

External links 
 Official ISU results

Grand Prix of Figure
2017 in figure skating
Grand Prix of Figure Skating Final
ISU Junior Grand Prix
International figure skating competitions hosted by Japan
2017 in youth sport
Grand Prix of Figure Skating
Figure skating in Japan